1-NP may refer to:

 Naphthylpiperazine
 1-Nitropropane